Cleveland Francis (born April 22, 1945) is an American country music singer, songwriter, and cardiologist. Active since the late 1960s, Francis has recorded a total of nine albums, including three for Liberty Records. He has charted four times on Billboard Hot Country Songs, most successfully with "You Do My Heart Good" in 1992.

Biography
Francis began his music career as a folk and blues singer and songwriter in the late 1960s while still a graduate student at the College of William & Mary, where he graduated with a Master of Arts degree in 1969. He attended medical school at the Medical College of Virginia (now Virginia Commonwealth University School of Medicine), eventually becoming a cardiologist. However, in the late 1980s he switched his focus to country music, signing first to Playback Records. His debut country album Last Call for Love was released that year. The album included a single titled "Love Light", which was also made into a music video.

After seeing the video for "Love Light" on CMT, record producer Jimmy Bowen signed Francis to Liberty Records in 1992. Between 1992 and 1994, Francis released three studio albums on Liberty, in addition to charting four singles on the Billboard Hot Country Singles & Tracks (now Hot Country Songs) charts. In 1994 Francis returned to his medical practice in Northern Virginia. He is president of Mount Vernon Cardiology Associates. Francis has performed at The Birchmere in Alexandria, Virginia, and has a live album recorded there in 2006 called Storytime. In 2022, Francis released "Beyond the Willow Tree" on Forager Records, a remastered reissue of his 1970 self-released folk album, "Follow Me," which includes several other folk songs Francis had recorded as demos in 1968 and 1970.

Discography

Albums

Singles

Music videos

References

1945 births
Living people
20th-century African-American people
21st-century African-American people
African-American country musicians
African-American songwriters
American cardiologists
American country singer-songwriters
American male singer-songwriters
College of William & Mary alumni
Country musicians from Louisiana
Liberty Records artists
People from Jennings, Louisiana
Singer-songwriters from Louisiana